The Denmark men’s national football team ( or herrelandsholdet) represents Denmark and Greenland in men's international football competitions. It is controlled by the Danish Football Association (DBU), the governing body for the football clubs which are organised under DBU. Denmark's home stadium is Parken Stadium in the Østerbro district of Copenhagen; their head coach is Kasper Hjulmand.

Denmark were the winners of the Football at the 1906 Intercalated Games and silver medalists at the 1908 and 1912 Olympics. However, as amateurs who prohibited their internationals from becoming professionals at foreign clubs, Denmark did not qualify for the FIFA World Cup until 1986, although they won another Olympic silver in 1960.

Denmark has remained competitive in international tournaments. Triumph in the 1992 European Championship in Sweden marked the team's most prominent victory, defeating defending champions the Netherlands in the semi-final and world champions Germany in the final. They also won the 1995 King Fahd Cup, defeating Argentina in the final. Their best World Cup result was achieved in 1998, where they narrowly lost 3–2 in a quarter-final against Brazil. Denmark also made the round of 16 in 1986, 2002 and 2018.

Teams
Apart from the men's senior A-level team, Denmark competes with a women's national team, and has teams at various youth levels for both men and women, most prominently the under-21 national team. Historically, the A-level team competed in the Olympics until and including the 1988 tournament, whereafter Olympic games count as under-21 national games. In addition to the A-level team and youth teams, Denmark also has a special league national team named Ligalandsholdet, with the best Danish footballers from the Nordic leagues. Ligalandsholdet was created in January 1983, and has played unofficial games for the national team during the winter break of the Nordic leagues every year since, save for 2005 and 2011. Sometimes the media also refer to Ligalandsholdet as Denmark's B-team, as the best Danish footballers selected for the A-team often play in leagues outside of the Nordic countries. As such, the national team coach has on several occasions outlined the purpose of having unofficial matches played by Ligalandsholdet as an opportunity of testing new potential upcoming Danish players for the A-team.

History

Amateur years

On 12 April 1896, Denmark XI defeated Podilatikos Syllogos Athinon, either 9–0 or 15–0, at the Neo Phaliron Velodrome in Athens in a demonstration game during the 1896 Olympic Games.

On 18 April 1897, a game was played in Hamburg when a selection team from the Danish Football Association defeated a selection team from the Hamburg-Altona Football Association, 5–0 in the presence of 5,000 spectators.

The first three editions of the Olympic football event in 1900–1906 had an unofficial status, as the event was not yet open for national football teams to compete, and only had limited participation of three or four club teams from a few nations. Denmark had no club team invited in the 1900 Olympics and the 1904 Olympics, but then received a special invitation for the 1906 Olympics, to compete against one Greek club team (Athens) and two club teams from the Ottoman Empire (Smyrna and Thessaloniki). The team to represent Denmark was compiled of players from the Copenhagen Football Association (KBU), and they won the event, and thereby an unofficial gold medal. Two years later, in the first official football tournament at the 1908 Olympics, Denmark won a silver medal. At the next Olympics, in 1912, the team again won a silver medal, which was followed by a golden era from July 1912 until August 1920, with Denmark ranked most of the time as number one in the world by the Elo ranking. The first official national football match was played on 19 October 1908 during the Olympic Games in London. Denmark beat France's second team 9–0 in the tournament's quarterfinals.

Although Denmark figured fairly prominently in the pre-FIFA World Cup era, international success would elude them for years from the first World Cup in 1930 and forward. Despite the country's ability to produce outstanding football talents, the Danish Football Union (DBU) only had the ambition (or economy) to send the national team to play friendly matches and in the regional tournament, the Nordic Championship, from October 1920 until June 1948. When DBU opted to set their sights higher, they allowed the national team to start contesting the Olympics again, promptly resulting in a bronze medal at the 1948 Olympics. After, the team only reached the quarter-final at the 1952 Olympics, with the DBU choosing not to contest the next 1956 Olympics. As football remained an amateur past-time, most of the best Danish footballers moved abroad to make a living, and due to DBU enforcing the rule to bar all professionals from the national team, it started to become difficult to assemble a highly competitive team.

Denmark experienced their next revival at the 1960 Olympics with a third set of Olympic silver medals. This was followed by another notable performance at the 1964 European Nations' Cup, where Denmark impressively finished in fourth place. However, this finish was considered by many as being more the result of a comparatively easy draw rather than a result of a well-playing team. In order for Denmark to qualify for the semi-final, they only had to defeat Malta, Albania and Luxembourg. In the semi-final, Denmark fell 3–0 to the Soviet Union, then lost the third-place match to Hungary.

The strict rule of only allowing amateurism at the national team was finally abolished by the DBU in May 1971, as they had acknowledged this change was needed in order to build a highly competitive team. In February 1978, when the DBU also decided to allow professional football to be introduced in the Danish leagues, the way was at the same time paved for the national team to sign its first sponsorship with the well-known Danish brewery Carlsberg. The new sponsorship enabled the DBU to hire the German Sepp Piontek in July 1979 as the first full-time professional coach of the national team. The full transition of the national team from amateurism to professionalism had now been accomplished, and indeed, this would soon lead to a vast improvement in the performances of the team.

According to Rob Smyth and Lars Eriksen, authors of a book on the "Danish Dynamite" team that would soon emerge:

Danish Dynamite (1980–1990)
In the 1982 FIFA World Cup qualification, Denmark finished with eight points from eight matches, including a 3–1 win against the eventual World Cup champions Italy, but Denmark failed to qualify for the final tournament despite the impressive result. Qualification for UEFA Euro 1984 saw Denmark defeat England at Wembley Stadium when Allan Simonsen converted a penalty kick for a 1–0 win. Denmark qualified for their first international tournament since 1964, and the team was dubbed "Danish Dynamite" in a competition for the official Danish Euro 1984 song. Denmark's participation ended in the semi-final when the team lost on penalties to Spain, most remembered for Preben Elkjær's penalty miss, his shorts torn apart. Following the strong performance at the finals, the name "Danish Dynamite" became a mainstay for the following decade of the Danish national team under head coach Sepp Piontek.

Denmark made their first World Cup appearance in the 1986 World Cup, and with the attacking duo of Michael Laudrup and Preben Elkjær, thrashed Uruguay 6–1. In the second round, Denmark once again faced Spain and once more lost, 5–1, including four goals by Emilio Butragueño. The first Spanish goal was caused by a miss-timed backpass by Jesper Olsen to Butragueño, an unfortunate action subsequently coined as "a real Jesper Olsen" ("en rigtig Jesper Olsen"). The phrase would live on for 13 years, and was repeated by the Danish TV commentators in 1999, when an identical backpass was carried out by Jesper Grønkjær to Filippo Inzaghi in Grønkjær's debut for the national team.

Denmark qualified for Euro 1988, and nearly made the 1988 Olympics. Richard Møller Nielsen guided Denmark to a secured spot for the final tournament – ahead of West Germany, but following the discovery that Dane Per Frimann was not eligible for the team's 2–0 win over Poland, Denmark was penalised, and subsequently failed to qualify. At Euro 1988, Denmark's participation ended in early defeat after Denmark lost all the group games to Spain, West Germany and Italy. They then failed to qualify for the 1990 World Cup; Sepp Piontek resigned as head coach of the national team in April 1990, where he was replaced by Richard Møller Nielsen.

The Møller Nielsen fairytale: 1992 European Championship
Denmark began Euro 1992 qualification with a secure home victory against the Faroe Islands, but the following results in the qualification were an away draw against Northern Ireland and a 2–0 home loss against Yugoslavia. Danes Michael Laudrup and Brian Laudrup opted to quit the national team in November 1990. When Nielsen subsequently decided to dismiss quality players such as Jan Mølby and Jan Heintze from the squad, due to disciplinary problems, several newspapers began demanding that Nielsen step down as head coach. Despite this, Denmark won the rest of their five matches in the qualification group, including a 2–1 away win against Yugoslavia. This was not enough to qualify, as the team still had to settle with a second place in the group, behind Yugoslavia.

Due to international sanctions resulting from the Yugoslav wars, UEFA announced on 31 May 1992 – only ten days prior to the competition – that Yugoslavia was to be excluded from the competition and their place given to Denmark, who finished as the second-placed team in its qualifying group.

Contrary to popular belief, the team did not enter the tournament completely unprepared, after having rallied home from seaside vacations. The majority of players were already assembled to play a friendly match against the CIS when Denmark officially received Yugoslavia's spot. Relying heavily on goalkeeper Peter Schmeichel and his defence, as well as creative spark Brian Laudrup – having decided to make a comeback for the national team in April 1992 – the Danish team created one of the biggest surprises in the event's history, as they went on to win the European Championship trophy under head coach Nielsen's defensive playing style. Advancing from the group stage ahead of England and France, Denmark defeated the Netherlands – the defending Euro 1988 champions – on penalties in the semi-final. Then, in the final, Denmark won 2–0 win against reigning World Cup champions Germany, ensuring Denmark its first international trophy.

Decline and revival (1993–2000)
In August 1993, Michael Laudrup decided to settle his ongoing dispute with Richard Møller Nielsen about the team tactics and made a comeback to the national team. However, the following years Denmark saw mixed results, as they first failed to qualify for the 1994 World Cup, but then won the 1995 Confederations Cup, beating Copa América champions Argentina 2–0 in the final. As defending champions at Euro 1996, Denmark disappointed with a lackluster performance after an early elimination in the group stage. The team had achieved a respectable win against Turkey, a draw against Portugal and only a defeat to Croatia.

Nielsen's replacement was Swede Bo "Bosse" Johansson, who gave the team a more offensive strategy, and the 1998 World Cup saw the revival of the Danish team, starring both Laudrup brothers in their last international campaign. After defeating Saudi Arabia 1–0, drawing with South Africa and losing 2–1 to eventual champions France, Denmark defeated Nigeria 4–1 in the round of 16. They exited in the quarterfinals against Brazil.

Without the Laudrup brothers, Denmark qualified for Euro 2000, only to lose all three matches in the group stage.

The Olsen Gang (2000–2015)

Morten Olsen was named the new manager for Denmark in 2000 and the team was quickly dubbed the "Olsen Gang", a reference to the series of Danish movies based around the main character Egon Olsen and his genius (criminal) plans. The nickname was also used for the Danish team as an alternative to the more commonly used "Danish Dynamite", already in those days when Olsen played as a captain.  Denmark's tactics shifted from the preferred 4–4–2 formation practised by Bo Johansson to an even more attacking style with an emphasis on the wingers available at the time, namely Jesper Grønkjær and Dennis Rommedahl. Accordingly, the Olsen's preferred formation has been either a 4–3–3 or a 4–2–3–1. Olsen even possessed an outspoken opposition to the 4–4–2 system, as he threatened to leave his position as head coach in the event he was asked to deploy Denmark in that formation. To support the development of players for the new tactical 4–3–3 system, all national youth teams also changed their formation. Another change Olsen brought to the national team was to stress the importance of only using fit players who had been granted regular playing time at their club. However, at times he was forced to compromise from this principle, as the pool of players available in the relatively small nation did not always provide him viable substitute options.

Denmark qualified both for the 2002 World Cup and Euro 2004, but despite impressive results in the group stage in both tournaments, especially the 2–0 win against reigning World Cup winners France in 2002, Denmark failed to advance any further. At the 2002 World Cup, Denmark was defeated by England in the round of 16, and at Euro 2004, they were eliminated in the quarter-finals against the Czech Republic.

For the 2006 World Cup qualification, Denmark was paired with 2002 third place Turkey and eventual Euro 2004 champions Greece. Following a poor start to qualification, Denmark was trailing both Turkey and Ukraine. After failing to qualify for the 2006 World Cup, Morten Olsen considered leaving the job, having received several offers from club teams, but decided to stay and extended his contract until after the 2010 World Cup.

When Denmark's attempt to qualify for the Euro 2008 also failed, the team was heavily criticised. Despite this, Denmark qualified for the 2010 World Cup by winning the group, earning two wins against Sweden and four points against Portugal. Olsen's contract was extended for two further years, until Euro 2012.

At the 2010 World Cup, Denmark was grouped with Japan, Cameroon and the Netherlands. Denmark lost the first match 2–0 to the Netherlands, but then scored a 2–1 victory against Cameroon. The game against Japan, however ended with a 3–1 defeat.

In qualification for Euro 2012, Denmark was once again grouped with Portugal; Denmark secured first place in the group, qualifying directly for the final tournament. Out of eight qualifying matches, Denmark won six, drew one and lost one, resulting Olsen's contract to be extended until after the 2014 World Cup.

At Euro 2012, Denmark were drawn in the proclaimed "group of death", Group B, alongside Germany, the Netherlands and Portugal. After defeating the Netherlands 1–0, they lost 3–2 to Portugal, requiring a win against Germany to advance in the tournament. Despite Michael Krohn-Dehli's equaliser, Denmark lost 2–1 to Germany, and with Portugal defeating the Netherlands 2–1, Denmark was eliminated from the tournament after finishing third in Group B.

Denmark failed to qualify for the next two tournaments under Olsen. They finished second in their 2014 World Cup qualifying group but failed to achieve a play-off berth as they were the "worst" of the UEFA group runners-up (after excluding results against the bottom teams). In UEFA Euro 2016 qualifying they finished third in their group, behind Albania and eventual winners Portugal, but lost to Sweden in the play-offs.

When measuring the performance of the national team by winning share and earned points, Olsen's reign of the Danish national team from July 2000 until January 2012 has so far been the second-most successful in the era of full-time professional coaches, which began in July 1979. As of January 2012, Olsen had a winning share of 52.8%, and with three points for a victory and one for a draw, an average of 1.84 points per match. In comparison, Richard Møller Nielsen still has the best record among the professional coaches of the national team, with a 54.8% winning share and an average of 1.89 points per game.

Hareide era: 2016–2020
New coach Åge Hareide presided over the Danish campaign during the qualification stages. Denmark, ranked number 24 in the FIFA World Rankings at the time of the draw, were drawn into Group E, alongside Poland, Montenegro, Romania, Armenia, and Kazakhstan.
Despite suffering early defeats to Poland and Montenegro, the Danes rallied, and secured second place in the group, and a berth in the play-offs, with a 1–0 away to Montenegro. Denmark were rewarded for their second-place finish with a play-off against the Republic of Ireland. Denmark secured qualification with a 5–1 win at the Aviva Stadium in Dublin, which included a hat-trick by Christian Eriksen, who added to his tally of eight goals in qualification.

Denmark were allocated into Pot 3 in advance of the draw for the 2018 FIFA World Cup. They were drawn into Group C, alongside Australia, Peru, and France. Their campaign in Russia began in the Mordovia Arena, Saransk, against Peru. A Yussuf Poulsen goal in the second half secured three points for the Danes. However, they struggled against Australia in their second tie, as Christian Eriksen's early goal was cancelled out by a VAR-awarded penalty, converted by Mile Jedinak, in a game that ended 1–1. Denmark secured qualification in their final group game, playing out the only goalless draw in the entire tournament,
in the Luzhniki Stadium against France; a result which saw both teams progress.

Denmark faced Croatia in the round of 16, with the Croats topping Group D with three wins. Mathias Jørgensen scored within the first minute of the game to give Denmark the lead, but Mario Mandzukic equalised only three minutes later, leaving the teams equally perched at one goal apiece. The match remained at 1–1 after ninety minutes, necessitating thirty minutes of extra-time, which still failed to separate the teams, as Luka Modrić saw his late penalty saved by goalkeeper Kasper Schmeichel. As such, the tie was to be decided with a penalty shoot-out, with Schmeichel and his Croatian counterpart, Danijel Subašić, positioning themselves on the line to face five penalties each. Croatia advanced, as Subašić saved three shots from Eriksen, Lasse Schöne and Nicolai Jørgensen respectively. Ivan Rakitić scored the decisive penalty to eliminate the Danes, putting an end to their best World Cup campaign since 2002.

Following the World Cup, Denmark prepared for participation in the inaugural iteration of the UEFA Nations League, having been drawn in League B against Wales and the Republic of Ireland. The tournament offers an alternative route of qualification for the European Championship, and increases the number of competitive games for international sides, replacing friendlies.

Owing to a dispute with the players' union regarding the commercial rights of the players, the Danish Football Union named an entirely uncapped squad, consisting of a mixture of futsal players and players from the Danish 2nd Division and the Denmark Series (the third and fourth tier of Danish football respectively), in lieu of the regular side, to face Slovakia in a pre-Nations League friendly, and it was feared that the same squad would be used for the competitive fixture against Wales. The dispute arose due to the image rights of the players, with Hummel having the exclusive right to the manufacture and marketing of Danish kits. The DBU wanted to use individual players, without explicit permissions, in their advertising. Hareide would similarly not be involved, with the side instead falling under the temporary management of John Jensen, with Hasse Kuhn serving as the assistant manager. The Danish FA are currently under a four-year probationary period with UEFA for having forfeited a Women's World Cup qualification game against Sweden in 2017 due to a similar dispute with the women's team, and a further violation could have resulted in Denmark being prohibited from participation in either the 2018–19 UEFA Nations League or the 2020 European Championship. After a temporary agreement enabled the return of the regular players, the Danes won their first Nations League fixture 2–0.

Hareide managed Denmark during UEFA Euro 2020 qualifying and won four matches, drawing four more. This meant Denmark qualified for the tournament, but due to the COVID-19 pandemic the tournament was postponed to 2021, and Hareide's contract expired on 30 June 2020. He was replaced by Kasper Hjulmand.

Hjulmand era: 2020–present
At UEFA Euro 2020, Denmark lost their first group stage match against Finland; Eriksen suffered a cardiac arrest in the 43rd minute, causing the match to be halted. They reached the semi-finals despite finishing the group stage with only one win, in which they lost 2–1 in extra-time against England. In the 2022–23 UEFA Nations League A, they finished second in their group, only one point behind Croatia and winning twice against world champions France. Denmark also qualified for the 2022 FIFA World Cup, topping Group F in the qualification campaign ahead of Scotland, with nine victories. Only one defeat occurred in the final fixture against the Scots in a game which Denmark were already guaranteed a direct place in Qatar.

In the 2022 World Cup, Denmark were drawn again with old foe France, together with African powerhouse Tunisia and Asian underdogs Australia in group D. Due to their impressive Euro 2020 performance and World Cup qualifying and Nations League displays, expectations for Denmark to make a historic breakthrough were high and the Danes were even seen as the biggest dark horses in the World Cup, with predictions going as far as winning it. Denmark were reinforced with the return of captain Christian Eriksen, who recovered from the Euro 2020 stroke. They began their World Cup quest in Qatar with a goalless draw to Tunisia in a game where the Danes controlled possession. In the second game, Denmark played France in the Nations League rematch. This time Les Bleus prevailed over the Danes 2–1, with a brace from Kylian Mbappé after an equaliser from Andreas Christensen. Denmark were forced to beat Australia, who previously downed Tunisia; however, Denmark demonstrated a rather poor performance against the Aussies, unable to break the deadlock and conceding a goal by Mathew Leckie to lose 1–0. Denmark finished last in their group with only one point and one goal scored. Moreover, the elimination by Australia meant Denmark were eliminated by an Asian representative for the second time in its history, having been eliminated by Japan back in 2010.

Team image

Supporters

Apart from the national team, Denmark is equally famous for its traveling fans, known as roligans. The movement emerged during the 1980s as the declared opposition to hooliganism. The goal of the roligan movement is calm, yet cheerful, support during the matches, as "rolig" means "calm" in the Danish language. The roligans have since developed an image of easy-going nature and rabid support, and are often considered amongst the world's best national team fans, along with the Tartan Army of Scotland. They were collectively given the FIFA FairPlay Award at the 1984 European Championships. Just before the 1986 World Cup, the roligan movement was organized in order to support the national team at the tournament.

The reputation of the Danish supporters was sullied by an attack from a fan which occurred in June 2007 in the Euro 2008 qualifying match against Sweden, when an enraged Danish supporter invaded the pitch and tried to attack the referee, following his decision to hand out a red card for Christian Poulsen and a penalty kick to Sweden in the last minute of the match. The attacking fan was stopped by some of the Danish football players on the field before he reached the referee, but due to the episode, the match was immediately cancelled by the referee, with UEFA subsequently deciding to award a 0–3 default defeat to Denmark as punishment.

Rivalry

Denmark's main rival is Sweden. The countries have played against each other 107 times, of which Denmark have won 40, drawn 20 and lost 47. The first match between the teams was an 8–0 Denmark win in May 1913. Denmark won their first five matches against Sweden before their first defeat in October 1916, 4–0.

The first competitive match between the countries was a 1–0 loss for Denmark in the group stage of UEFA Euro 1992. Both teams advanced from the group stage and Denmark went on to win the tournament. In UEFA Euro 2004 the teams drew 2–2 in the last group match, ensuring that both teams advanced at the expense of Italy. In Denmark's home match against Sweden in the qualification for UEFA Euro 2008, the visitors were awarded a 3–0 win after a Danish fan invaded the pitch and attacked the referee. The reverse fixture ended in a goalless draw and Denmark failed to qualify for the final tournament.

In the qualification for the 2010 FIFA World Cup, Denmark won both matches against Sweden 1–0 and qualified for the World Cup. In the play-off round of the qualification for UEFA Euro 2016, Denmark lost to Sweden 4–3 on aggregate and failed to qualify for the finals. The most recent match between the countries was a 2–0 win for Denmark in November 2020.

Kit

The team kit is produced by Danish company Hummel. It is all-red with white details to reflect the colours of the Danish national flag. Prior to the period of Adidas sponsorship, the kit provider was also Hummel from 1979 to 2004.

Media coverage
Denmark's home and away matches are broadcast by TV2 on television, and DR on the radio.

Home stadium

The first home match for the Denmark national team was a 2–1 friendly win over England on 25 May 1910, taking place with 12,000 spectators at the stadium "KBs baner" (located in the area "Granen", where the Forum Copenhagen later was built). As the facilities were considered too small, a new stadium in Copenhagen was built with the name Idrætsparken, that since its opening 25 May 1911 hosted all the home matches of the football club KB and most of the home matches of the national team. During the first 82 years of the national team, from October 1908 until November 1990, Denmark played a total number of 254 A-level home matches, of which 232 were played in Idrætsparken. Among all the played home matches in Idrætsparken, Denmark achieved 125 victories (54%), 41 draws (18%) and 66 defeats (28%). The stadium reached a record of 51,600 spectators for the 1–2 game against Sweden in June 1957.

In regards of the first era from 1908 to 1990, only 22 home matches were played at other stadiums than Idrætsparken, of which 11 took place at Aarhus Idrætspark (then known as Atletion) in Aarhus, followed by Aalborg Stadion in Aalborg with six games, and the remaining five matches hosted by four other stadiums. Whenever another stadium than Idrætsparken was used for a home match, it was only for some of the less important friendly games or Olympic qualifiers. While only Idrætsparken was used to host the matches related to big important tournaments, like the Nordic championship, the UEFA European Championship and FIFA World Cup. When a major rebuild of Idrætsparken began in December 1990, the subsequent two official Euro 1992 qualification matches were moved to Odense Stadium in Odense.

On 9 September 1992, the rebuilt Idrætsparken, now called Parken and later renamed Telia Parken for sponsorship reasons, became the biggest venue in Denmark with a capacity of 42,358 spectators, and was opened with a friendly 1–2 defeat against Germany. This first match in Parken was viewed by 40,500 spectators, while the current stadium record of 42,099 spectators was set on 8 October 2005 for a World Cup qualifying match against Greece.

The capacity of the stadium was later reduced to 38,009 seats after the upper part of the D-side was converted from 4,000 extra seats into office and VIP areas in June 2009. Despite this decrease in capacity, the stadium is today still the biggest venue in Denmark by far; the next largest venue, Brøndby Stadium, only has a capacity of 26,000 seats. From September 1992 to May 2006, Parken was the sole stadium of all the men's senior national team matches. However, meagre spectator support at some of the friendly matches at Parken, which from 2000 to 2005 attracted an acceptable average of 23,862 per match – but down to 9,598 for the friendly 3–1 win over Israel in April 2002 – prompted the DBU to start hosting many of the friendly matches to other stadiums around Denmark. These other stadiums had less spectator capacity than Parken, but just about enough to cover the Danes' somewhat lesser interest for friendly matches.

On 27 May 2006, Parken's 13-year monopoly on national team matches was broken for the first time when Denmark played a friendly match at the Aarhus Idrætspark against upcoming 2006 World Cup participants Paraguay. Tickets to this match were sold out quickly, with almost 19,000 of the 20,227 tickets sold within the first hour of sale, and was support-wise a big success with a total audience of 20,047 spectators. When the two next friendly matches were played at some other new venues, 16 August at Fionia Park in Odense against Poland, and on 1 September at Brøndby Stadium against Portugal, the number of spectators dropped to a disappointing level. The Poland match attracted only 11,088 spectators, while the Portugal match only 13,186 spectators. In particular, the Portugal match was deemed as a support-wise failure because it featured a higher-ranked opponent, which spectators normally would have a high interest to watch. The main reasons why Brøndby Stadium failed to attract a high number of spectators were generally thought to be a combination of the poor rainy weather and the fact the stadium is located on the outskirts of Copenhagen, and as such does not attract a new demographic audience compared to Parken, due to the travel distances being more or less the same for the majority of the population.

Currently, while most of the friendly matches continue to be played at some of the smaller stadiums in Denmark, it has been decided to continue playing all of the qualifying matches for the European Championships and World Cup only at Parken Stadium. Those friendly matches, which are believed to create a high interest from spectators, will also continue to be played at Parken. For example, the friendly against Germany in August 2010 was played at Parken Stadium due to the high expectation of spectators desiring to watch the match. However, after Denmark's performance at the 2010 World Cup, the friendly only drew 19,071 spectators. From September 1992 to January 2012, Denmark played a total of 77 A-level matches at Parken Stadium, of which 49 were won, 16 were drawn and 12 lost.

Results and fixtures 

The following is a list of match results from the previous 12 months, as well as any future matches that have been scheduled.

2022

2023

Coaching staff
When the national team is assembled and train together ahead of a match, the team is coached by:

Managers

The responsibility and job description for the manager of the Denmark national football team, has changed throughout the history. From 1908 to 1918, the DBU preferred to assign a manager with the overall responsibility. This was followed by a long era from 1919 to 1956 where either no manager or only a caretaker manager was assigned. When the DBU assigned Arne Sørensen (November 1956 – December 1961) and Poul Petersen (January 1962 –December 1966) as managers for a rolling period of several years, they were given the responsibility to coach the physical training and decide the team tactics before and during each match, but had no influence upon the selection of players for the national squad, which was a job for the specially-appointed selection committee, the UdtagelsesKomitéen.

From 1967 to 1969, the management of the team more or less became a sole responsibility for the UdtagelsesKomitéen, following a new approach. In this new approach, the job to select players continued to be the responsibility for the UdtagelsesKomitéen, but the chairman of the committee was now also appointed to be the "tactical manager" of the national team, as the DBU realized the need of having a special tactical manager assigned to get influence upon both the selection of players and the related tactics before and during the game. However, the appointed tactical manager did not have the responsibility to train the squad, as a special physical coach was instead selected for that job. In 1970, the approach with two managers assigned was again abandoned when the DBU realized the need to assign only one manager with the sole responsibility for the squad.

From 1970 to 1979, the job to select players was not yet a sole responsibility of the manager alone, but only a shared responsibility, as this continued to be a matter for the UdtagelsesKomitéen to decide. When a selection of players had to be made, it was decided by a vote in the committee, with the appointed manager being granted an influence of three votes and the four members of the committee being granted one vote each. This special selection procedure continued until July 1979, where it was decided to award the sole responsibility of all manager-related areas to the manager himself, with the assignment of Sepp Piontek as the first full-time professional manager of the national team.

Manager history 
The box below, list all assigned football managers for the national team, since the first official game in October 1908. During the years from 1911 to 1961, a total of 169 games were played without an assigned manager.

Players

Current squad

Caps and goals updated as of 30 November 2022, following the match against .

Recent call-ups
The following list of active players were not called up for the latest match of the national team, but were called up for an A-level match within the last 12 months.

INJ

PRE
PRE

INJ

INJ
PRE

INJ
INJ

 INJ = Withdrew due to injury
 PRE = Preliminary squad
 SUS = Serving suspension
 RET = Retired from the national team
 COV = COVID-19 positive test or close contact

Previous squads

Olympics
Olympics 1908 squad
Olympics 1912 squad
Olympics 1920 squad
Olympics 1948 squad
Olympics 1952 squad
Olympics 1960 squad
Olympics 1972 squad
Olympics 1992 squad
Olympics 2016 squad

UEFA European Championship
Euro 1964 squad
Euro 1984 squad
Euro 1988 squad
Euro 1992 squad
Euro 1996 squad
Euro 2000 squad
Euro 2004 squad
Euro 2012 squad
Euro 2020 squad

FIFA World Cup
World Cup 1986 squad
World Cup 1998 squad
World Cup 2002 squad
World Cup 2010 squad
World Cup 2018 squad
World Cup 2022 squad

FIFA Confederations Cup
Confederations Cup 1995 squad

Player history

The players are freely chosen by the national team manager. They are normally assembled from their respective club teams at the Hotel Marienlyst in Elsinore for a week-long training camp preluding the upcoming match. Friendly matches are typically played on a Wednesday evening. World Cup qualifiers are played on both Saturday and Wednesday evenings, while Euro qualifiers now take place on both a Friday and Tuesday evening when playing two matches in a row, or on a Friday/Saturday/Tuesday at rounds with only one match scheduled.

Best players of all time
In November 2006, the DBU nominated eight Danish national team footballers for the "Best Danish Footballer of All Time" award. The nominated players were Morten Olsen, Henning Jensen, Allan Simonsen, Preben Elkjær, Michael Laudrup, Brian Laudrup, Peter Schmeichel and Jon Dahl Tomasson. The winner of the award was decided by a public vote arranged by the broadcasting channel TV2, which ended with Michael Laudrup as a clear winner, with 58% of the votes.

Hall of Fame
Denmark's Hall of Fame was established in October 2008, as a special award to celebrate the best footballers, teams and coaches; throughout the history of the national team. A jury with 6 people (representing the newspapers, authors of football books, active players of the national team, TV2, the DBU, and a Hall of Fame member), each year have the job to award one or two new members for the Hall of Fame. The award will be handed out at the official Danish Football Awards, which is a yearly television broadcast event – organized by the DBU in November throughout 2008 to 2013 and subsequently moved to a later date in February. Beside of receiving the award, all Hall of Fame members are also invited to leave a footprint in bronze, to decorate the entrance hall at "Fodboldens hus" -the DBU headquarters in Brøndby. When the DBU celebrated its 125-year anniversary in May 2014, it decided to make an extraordinary award of nine additional Hall of Fame Members, all playing during the first half of the DBU national team's existence, from 1908 to 1964. Because of financial restraints, the DBU cancelled the planned televised broadcast of the Football Award in February 2015, and for the same reason opted not to award any new Hall of Fame members in this specific year. The DBU expected to return awarding new Hall of Fame members again, when the next broadcast Football Award event is organized in February 2016.

Hall of Fame members
Sorted by last year appearing at the national football team.

Sophus Krølben Nielsen (1908–1919)
Nils Middelboe (1908–1920)
Sophus Målmand Hansen (1911–1920)
Carl Skomar Hansen (1918–1921)
Poul "Tist" Nielsen (1910–1925)
Pauli Jørgensen (1925–1939)
Carl Aage Præst (1945–1949)
Eigil Nielsen (1940–1951)
Knud Lundberg (1943–1956)
Aage Rou Jensen (1945–1957)
Harald Nielsen (1959–1960)
Henry From (1957–1961)
Poul Pedersen (1953–1964)
Henning Enoksen (1958–1966)
Per Røntved (1970–1982)
Allan Simonsen (1972–1986)
Frank Arnesen (1977–1987)
Preben Elkjær (1977–1988)
Søren Lerby (1978–1989)
Danish Dynamite team (1980–1989)
Sepp Piontek (coach, 1979–1990)
Euro 1992 team (June 1992)
Lars Høgh (1983–1995)
Richard Møller Nielsen (coach, 1990–1996)
Michael Laudrup (1982–1998)
Brian Laudrup (1987–1998)
Peter Schmeichel (1987–2001)
Morten Olsen (1970–1989, coach 2000–2015)

Payment
Each national team player receives a set amount of money per match, including bonuses for a win and qualification for European Championship and World Cup tournaments. Throughout the years, the prize money has gone from around €1,340 for a match win in 1987 and around €26,800 for the Euro 1988 participation alone, to around €67,000 for the 1998 World Cup, and up to €107,000 for the 2002 World Cup participations, per player.

Currently, the payments for participation in games outside the big tournaments are regulated by a collective agreement – to be renegotiated after a certain number of years – while all payments for participation of players in a final tournament squad are regulated by the "1998 agreement" between the DBU and Spillerforeningen. The "1998 agreement" stipulates that whenever the national team qualifies for a World Cup or European Championship tournament, the selected players for the final tournament shall receive 50% of the DBU's revenues from the event, and 65% of the DBU's revenues from the sale of merchandise and license agreements. Additionally, the sponsors of the national team also pay a relatively high "qualification bonus" each time the team qualifies for a final tournament. This bonus is shared between the group of players being selected for the final 18-man squad, to one or several of the qualification matches played, with the exact distribution normally decided according to the number of times the player was selected.

Each of the 23 selected players for the 2002 World Cup received DKK 498,000 (equal to €66,800) from the event revenues, plus DKK 122,900 (equal to €16,500) from the sale of merchandise and license agreements, plus an unknown qualification bonus from the sponsors, plus the standard payment from the DBU each time they were selected for the final 18-man squad to a qualification match. In comparison, each of the 23 selected players for the 2010 World Cup received DKK 635,000 (equal to €85,100) from the event revenues, plus DKK 98,900 (equal to €13,200) from the sale of merchandise and license agreements, plus a qualification bonus from the sponsors at DKK 2,800,000 (equal to €375,000) to be shared between the players – corresponding to an amount of €2,080 per time the player was selected for the final 18-man squad to a qualification match. In addition to the qualification bonus, the players also received this standard payment from the DBU each time they were selected for the 18-man squad to a qualification match:

 Starting fee: home games = DKK 1,2 per spectator, away games = DKK 8,290
 Bonus for a draw: home games = DKK 0, away games = DKK 9,475
 Bonus for a win: home games = DKK 17,765, away games = DKK 29,600

Based on Denmark's results and number of spectators at home matches, the standard qualification match payment to a player selected for all Denmark's qualification matches equals a total amount of DKK 235,898 (or €31,600) for the six qualification matches in the 2008–09 season, and a total amount of DKK 170,788 (or €22,900) for the four qualification matches in the 2009–10 season. Finally, the players could also add a seasonal payment named "regular bonus" from the sponsors, with a total of DKK 4,350,000 (equal to €583,100) to be shared each season by the squad of 18 players selected for a match, meaning a player who was selected for all national team matches from 1 August to 31 July would receive an additional DKK 241,700 (equal to €32,400) payment in both the 2008–09 and 2009–10 seasons.

The last amount of a players income generated by the national team is the standard payment received for each friendly match:
 Starting fee: home games = DKK 1,0 per spectator, away games = DKK 5,000
 Bonus for a draw: home games = DKK 0, away games = DKK 0
 Bonus for a win: home games = DKK 10,000, away games = DKK 10,000

Based on Denmark's results and number of spectators at home matches, the standard payment to a player selected for all Denmark's friendly matches equals a total amount of DKK 41,426 (or €5,500) for the three friendly matches in the 2008–09 season, and a total amount of DKK 88,773 (or €11,900) for the seven friendly matches in the 2009–10 season.

When all these payments are added together for a player, under the assumption a player was selected for all matches in each season as well as the final 2010 World Cup squad, he would have received a total payment from the DBU of €69,500 in the 2008–09 season and a total payment from the DBU of €186,300 in the 2009–10 season.

Player records

Players listed in bold are still active at national level.

Most capped players

Top goalscorers

Competitive record*Best result: Quarter-finals in 1998.FIFA World Cup*Draws include knockout matches decided via penalty shoot-out.UEFA European Championship

UEFA Nations League

Olympic Games

FIFA Confederations Cup

CONMEBOL–UEFA Cup of Champions*Draws include knockout matches decided on penalty kicks.Head-to-head recordAs of 30 November 2022 after the match against Honours

Official
UEFA European Championship
 Champions: 1992
 Third Place: 1984, 2020
 Fourth place: 1964
FIFA Confederations Cup
 Champions: 1995
CONMEBOL–UEFA Cup of Champions:
 Runners-up: 1993
Olympic Games
 Silver medal: 1908, 1912, 1960
 Bronze medal: 1948
King's Cup (Thailand)
 Champions: 2010

Fifa Fair Play Award
 Winner: 2021

 Minor titles 
 Nordic Football Championship
 Winners (3): 1924-28, 1978-80, 1981-82,

Notes

References

Literature
Palle "Banks" Jørgensen (2002), "Landsholdets 681 profiler fra 1908 til i dag''" , TIPS-Bladet, .

External links

Official website
FIFA profile
UEFA profile
Official player and match statistics
Official league national team page 
Official national team shop
De Danske Roligans
National team, players and others (statistics)

1908 establishments in Denmark
 
European national association football teams
FIFA Confederations Cup-winning countries
UEFA European Championship-winning countries